VRDL may refer to:

 Victorian Roller Derby League
 Viral Research and Diagnostic Laboratories